Cordiera is a genus of flowering plants in the family Rubiaceae. The genus is found in central and southern tropical America.

Species

 Cordiera concolor (Cham.) Kuntze
 Cordiera concolor var. concolor
 Cordiera concolor var. goyana C.H.Perss. & Delprete
 Cordiera elliptica (Cham.) Kuntze
 Cordiera garapatica (K.Schum.) Kuntze
 Cordiera hadrantha (Standl.) C.H.Perss. & Delprete
 Cordiera humilis (K.Schum.) Kuntze
 Cordiera humilis var. amplexicaulis (S.Moore) C.H.Perss.
 Cordiera humilis var. humilis
 Cordiera longicaudata C.H.Perss. & Delprete
 Cordiera macrophylla (K.Schum.) Kuntze
 Cordiera myrciifolia (K.Schum.) C.H.Perss. & Delprete
 Cordiera rigida (K.Schum.) Kuntze
 Cordiera sessilis (Vell.) Kuntze
 Cordiera triflora A.Rich. ex DC.

References

External links
Cordiera in the World Checklist of Rubiaceae

Cordiereae
Rubiaceae genera